Mariama is a female name. It may  refer to:

Mariama Bâ (1929–1981), Senegalese author and feminist
Mariama Barry, Senegalese novelist
Mariama Sonah Bah (born 1978), Guinean judoka
Mariama Souley Bana (born 1987), Nigerien swimmer
Mariama Dalanda Barry (born 1991), Guinean taekwondo practitioner
Mariama Gamatié Bayard (born 1958), Nigerien politician and women's rights activist
Mariama Colley, Gambian radio personality, human rights activist and actress
Mariama Kesso Diallo, Guinean writer living in Switzerland
Mariama Goodman, English dancer and singer who has been a member of the bands Solid HarmoniE and the Honeyz.
Mariama Hima (born 1951), Nigerien film director, ethnologist and politician
Mariama Mamoudou Ittatou (born 1997), Nigerien sprinter
Mariama Jalloh, Mariama Jalloh (born 1986), Sierra Leonean singer–songwriter established in France 
Mariama Jamanka (born 1990), German bobsledder 
Mariama Keïta (1946-2018), Niger's first woman journalist and feminist activist
Mariama Khan (born 1977), Gambian filmmaker, poet, cultural activist and scholar
Mariama Ndoye (born 1953), Senegalese writer 
Mariama Ouiminga (born 1970), Burkinabé sprinter
Mariama Owusu, Ghanaian jurist
Mariama Sarr (born 1963), Senegalese politician
Mariama Signaté (born 1985), Senegalese-French handball player
Mariama Sow (born 2000), Guinean swimmer
Mariama White-Hammond, African-American minister

See also
Elea-Mariama Diarra (born 1990), French athlete
Maryam/Mariam

Feminine given names